54 University Avenue is a house in Bahan Township, Yangon. It is the residence of Aung San Suu Kyi, a Burmese politician and former State Counsellor of Myanmar. The house is situated on the University Avenue Road, adjacent to Inya Lake.

History

In 1953, following the death of her elder brother, Aung San Suu Kyi, her mother Khin Kyi and her eldest brother Aung San Oo moved from their house on Tower Lane, near Kandawgyi Lake, to this colonial-era villa facing Inya Lake, on University Avenue Road.

Political significance

Aung San Suu Kyi met people of various backgrounds, political views and religions in the house during 1988 uprisings. She remained under house arrest for almost 15 of the 21 years from 1989 to 2010 in the house.

On 22 September 2007, although still under house arrest, Aung San Suu Kyi made a brief public appearance at the gate of the house to accept the blessings of Buddhist monks during the Saffron revolution.

On 2 May 2008, after the Cyclone Nargis, the roof of the house was damaged and Aung San Suu Kyi lived in virtual darkness after losing electricity. She used candles at night as she was not provided any generator set. The house was renovated in August 2009.

On 4 May 2009, an American citizen John Yettaw trespassed the house two weeks before her scheduled release from house arrest on 27 May. It is illegal in Myanmar to have a guest stay overnight at one's home without notifying the authorities first. This illegal visit prompted Aung San Suu Kyi's arrest on 13 May 2009 and sentenced to eighteen months of house arrest, which effectively meant that she was unable to participate in the 2010 elections.

On 13 November 2010, she waved from behind the gate of the house to her supporters who rushed to the house when nearby barricades were removed by the security forces, celebrating the end of her house arrest.

Ownership lawsuit
In 2000, Aung San Oo brought legal action against Aung San Suu Kyi in the Yangon High Court demanding a half-share of the house. There was widespread speculation among observers at the time that Aung San Oo would then sell his half-share to the ruling State Peace and Development Council junta, but the High Court ruled against him, much to the surprise of the same observers, who had assumed that it would bring down whatever verdict was preferred by the junta. Time magazine reports that, according to Burmese exiles and observers in Yangon, the junta used the alleged surrogacy of  Aung San Oo and his lawsuit as an act of spite against her.

Portrayal in film
The house was featured in Luc Besson's 2011 film The Lady. Under director Luc Besson's helm, his crew also pursued accuracy. Even the cardinal directions were respected when the house was rebuilt, so that the audience would see the sunrise in the same way, based on satellite images and about 200 family photographs, they constructed a precise 1:1 scale model of this house.

References 

Buildings and structures in Yangon
Aung San Suu Kyi